The 1975–76 season was Manchester United's 74th season in The Football League and first in the First Division after winning the Second Division the season prior. They finished the season third in the First Division, their highest placing since 1968, to qualify for the UEFA Cup.

They reached the FA Cup Final at Wembley, where they lost 1–0 to Southampton of the Second Division. The only goal of the game came from Saints striker Bobby Stokes. It was the second time since World War II that a Second Division team had won the trophy, the other occasion had been three years earlier, when Sunderland beat Leeds United.

First Division

FA Cup

League Cup

Squad statistics

References

Manchester United F.C. seasons
Manchester United